Des Moines River Locks No. 5 and No. 7, also known as the Bonaparte and Keosauqua Locks, comprise a discontinuous historic site located along the Des Moines River in Van Buren County, Iowa, United States. Lock No. 5 is located in a riverfront park in Bonaparte, and lock No. 7 is located near Keosauqua. The locks are the only structures that are known to exist for the Des Moines River Improvement Project. Steamboats were the primary means of transportation into the interior of Iowa, but the river was only navigable at certain times of the year and that made the shipping season too short and unpredictable. In 1846 the Iowa Legislature conceived a plan to build a lock and dam system along the Des Moines River to make it navigable from the Mississippi River to the city of Des Moines. These two locks and a third at Bentonsport, non extant, were the only locks of the 28 planned locks and dams that were completed. The project ended in 1858 because it was mismanaged, and the Keokuk and Des Moines River Railroad was being developed to cover the same territory at the same time. Two dams had also been completed, but they have since been removed. Even though the project was never completed, navigation was possible via the locks as far upriver as Keosauqua.

Lock No. 5 was begun in 1849 and completed in 1852. It was built by Meeks and Sons from Bonaparte. The recesses for the lower gates are still visible, as are some of the iron rings that were used to tie boats to the sides. At a later date, stone from the side walls was used to create a third wall across the lower end of the lock in an attempt to stabilize the structure. The lock itself is now silted in. Lock No. 7 was begun circa 1851 and was not completed until 1856 because of major structural problems. Keosauqua contractor Bonney and Whittelsey was responsible for its construction. The walls for both locks are composed of large blocks of locally quarried limestone that are set on a foundation of limestone bedrock. The locks were listed on the National Register of Historic Places in 1977. In 1989 Lock No. 5 was included as a contributing property in the Bonaparte Historic Riverfront District.

References

Transport infrastructure completed in 1852
Transport infrastructure completed in 1856
Keosauqua, Iowa
Bonaparte, Iowa
Transportation buildings and structures in Van Buren County, Iowa
National Register of Historic Places in Van Buren County, Iowa
Locks on the National Register of Historic Places in Iowa
Individually listed contributing properties to historic districts on the National Register in Iowa